Tadeu de Jesus Nogueira Júnior (born 9 July 1981), commonly known as Juninho, is a Brazilian footballer who plays as goalkeeper for Audax São Paulo.

Vitória

Juninho started his career at Bahia club Vitória. In 2005 season he became an understudy of Felipe but both players left the club after the club relegated to Série C.

Cruzeiro

In 2006, he was signed by Cruzeiro in 2-year contract. He was the third keeper, behind Fábio and Lauro. In May 2006 he was loaned to fellow Série A team Santa Cruz. In January 2007 he left for América (MG) until the end of Campeonato Mineiro (which he was the first choice from round 4 to 10), and on 1 June left for América (RN) until the end of season.

Atlético Mineiro

In July 2007 he was signed by Atlético Mineiro in 1-year contract. At first he was an understudy of Édson and then played 12 league matches since September. In 2008 season, he also played 15 league matches as second choice. In 2008 Campeonato Mineiro, he played 11 matches ahead Edson, except round 2 to 5. In March 2008 he signed a new 3-year contract.

Série B clubs

On 9 July 2009 he left for Juventude until the end of 2009 season, after becoming the third choice behind Aranha and Édson. Soon after, Atlético Mineiro also signed Fabián Carini.

In December 2009 he left for Paraná. He played almost all the games for the team. In January 2011 he signed an annual deal with Portuguesa. He was the understudy of Weverton.

In May 2011, Série B club ABC attempted to sign him, but eventually failed. Instead, he joined Grêmio Barueri.

International career

Juninho was the second keeper behind Heurelho Gomes in 2004 CONMEBOL Men Pre-Olympic Tournament. He capped once for Brazil U-23 team on 18 November 2003, an unofficial friendly with Santos FC.

Career statistics

1No data available for Campeonato Baiano and Campeonato do Nordeste
2No data available for Campeonato Mineiro
30 games in 2006 Campeonato Mineiro
47 games in 2007 Campeonato Mineiro
511 games in 2008 Campeonato Mineiro
617 games in 2009 Campeonato Mineiro
720 games in 2010 Campeonato Paranaense
8 Campeonato Paulista
9 See note 1 to 8.

Honours
regional
Brazilian North-East League: 2003
state
League of Bahia State: 2000, 2002, 2003, 2004, 2005
League of Minas Gerais state: 2006

References

External links
 Futpedia 
 
 CBF Contract Record 
 

Brazilian footballers
Esporte Clube Vitória players
Cruzeiro Esporte Clube players
Santa Cruz Futebol Clube players
América Futebol Clube (MG) players
América Futebol Clube (RN) players
Clube Atlético Mineiro players
Esporte Clube Juventude players
Paraná Clube players
Associação Portuguesa de Desportos players
Grêmio Barueri Futebol players
Grêmio Osasco Audax Esporte Clube players
Association football goalkeepers
People from Ribeirão Preto
1981 births
Living people
Footballers from São Paulo (state)